Marshall Manesh (born August 16, 1950) is an Iranian-American actor.

Biography 
When Manesh was young, his father died; he was raised by his mother, from whom he feels he got his strength to make it in show business.

He went to the United States in the mid-70s, joined the Persian Theater Group, and traveled extensively throughout the US, Canada and Europe for eight years.

His debut film was True Lies, directed by James Cameron. He has since appeared in more than 100 feature films, in television projects, and in more than 40 commercials.

Manesh has appeared in recurring roles on the television shows Will & Grace, Scrubs, Andy Barker, P.I., Hot in Cleveland, Boston Legal, and, most notably, How I Met Your Mother, where he played taxi driver Ranjit. Though Ranjit was depicted as Bangladeshi in the series, Manesh delivered several lines in his native Persian.

He has also guest starred on many shows, including Burn Notice, Law & Order: Special Victims Unit, Joey, Persons Unknown, The X-Files, Scrubs, ER, JAG, NYPD Blue, Cooper Barrett's Guide to Surviving Life and Prison Break.

Manesh has acted in several movies, including True Lies, Stealing Harvard, The Big Lebowski, Kazaam, The Poseidon Adventure, Seeking a Friend for the End of the World, Pirates of the Caribbean: At World's End (with fellow Iranian-descended actor and friend Omid Djalili), Jimmy Vestvood: Amerikan Hero, and the Vampire western A Girl Walks Home Alone at Night.

He made a cameo appearance as the cab driver on Madonna's 2005 video for "Hung Up".

He served as a judge at the 6th annual Noor Iranian Film Festival.

Selected filmography

Checkpoint (1987) .... Abe
Guests of Hotel Astoria (1989) .... Dr. Parto
True Lies (1994) .... Jamal Khaled
Barb Wire (1996) .... Sheik
Kazaam (1996) .... Malik
Univers'l (1997)
The Big Lebowski (1998) .... Doctor
Word of Mouth (1999) .... Hertzog
Wasted in Babylon (1999) .... Land Lord
The Last Producer (2000) .... Cabbie
Face the Music (2000) .... Indian Man
Guardian (2001) .... Iraqi Colonel
Showtime (2002) .... Convenience Store Owner
Hip, Edgy, Sexy, Cool (2002)
Stealing Harvard (2002) .... Toy Store Manager
Hidalgo (2004) .... Camel Skinner
Raise Your Voice (2004) .... Cabbie
Surviving Christmas (2004) .... Janitor (uncredited)
The L.A. Riot Spectacular (2005) .... Nephi
Looking for Comedy in the Muslim World (2005) .... Shaif Al-Rafi
Car Babes (2006) .... Babu Gulab
Pirates of the Caribbean: At World's End (2007) .... Sri Sumbhajee
Carts (2007) .... Fab
The Onion Movie (2008) .... Announcer (uncredited)
Pants on Fire (2008) .... Aram
Crossing Over (2009) .... Sanjar Baraheri
Year One (2009) .... Slave Trader
The Things We Carry (2009) .... Manager
Tom Cool (2009) .... Mr. Azu
Pickin' & Grinnin''' (2012) .... ClerkCommander and Chief (2012) .... SheikhSeeking a Friend for the End of the World (2012) .... Indian ManAfternoon Delight (2013) .... Taxi DriverAll American Christmas Carol (2013) .... Car SalesmanA Girl Walks Home Alone at Night (2014) .... Hossein 'The Junkie'Shirin in Love (2014) .... NaderBenjamin Troubles (2015) .... GenieJimmy Vestvood: Amerikan Hero (2016) .... Mehdi the ButcherA Life Lived (2016) .... DaneshThe Next Big Thing (2016) .... Mr. ShahTiger'' (2018) .... Kulwant

References

External links
 
 

1950 births
American male film actors
American male television actors
Iranian emigrants to the United States
Living people
People from Mashhad
20th-century American male actors
21st-century American male actors
Iranian diaspora film people
Iranian male television actors
21st-century Iranian male actors